Fuerzas Amardas Revolucionarias is Spanish for Revolutionary Armed Forces and can refer to:

Revolutionary Armed Forces of Colombia, a guerrilla group active in Colombia from 1964 to 2017
Indigenous Revolutionary Armed Forces of the Pacific, a revolutionary group in Colombia
Cuban Revolutionary Armed Forces, the army of Cuba